Harttia guianensis is a species of armored catfish endemic to French Guiana where it is found in the Sinnamary and Approuague River basins.  This species grows to a length of  SL.

References 

guianensis
Catfish of South America
Fish of French Guiana
Endemic fauna of French Guiana
Taxa named by Lúcia Helena Rapp Py-Daniel
Taxa named by Edinbergh Caldas de Oliveira
Fish described in 2001